Josip-Jerko "Joke" Vranković (born October 26, 1968) is a Croatian professional basketball executive, coach and former player. He currently works in the Strught Assembly of the Croatian Basketball Federation (HKS), as well as the secretary of the HKS.

References

1968 births
Living people
Basketball players from Split, Croatia
Croatian men's basketball players
Olympic basketball players of Croatia
Basketball players at the 1996 Summer Olympics
ABA League players
KK Zadar players
KK Cibona players
KK Split players
Croatian basketball coaches
KK Cibona coaches
HKK Široki players
Shooting guards
1994 FIBA World Championship players
KK Alkar players